JTL may refer to:

 jtL, a Korean boy band
 J. T. Lambert Intermediate School, in Monroe County, Pennsylvania, United States
 Jérôme Thibouville-Lamy, a 19th-century French musical instrument making company
 JTL, a charity offering advanced apprenticeships in the building services sector